Mairago is a comune (municipality) in the Province of Lodi in the Italian region Lombardy, located about  southeast of Milan and about  southeast of Lodi.

Mairago borders the following municipalities: Cavenago d'Adda, Turano Lodigiano, Ossago Lodigiano, Secugnago, Brembio.

Economy
The main economical activity is the cultivation of corn, barley and, to a lesser extent,  wheat. Animal husbandry is also widespread, including beekeeping. Exploitation of methane reservoirs by AGIP is now virtually ended.

Twin towns
 Dancé, France

References

External links
Official website

Cities and towns in Lombardy